Janinów may refer to:

Janinów, Brzeziny County in Łódź Voivodeship (central Poland)
Janinów, Łowicz County in Łódź Voivodeship (central Poland)
Janinów, Tomaszów Mazowiecki County in Łódź Voivodeship (central Poland)
Janinów, Masovian Voivodeship (east-central Poland)
Janinów, Greater Poland Voivodeship (west-central Poland)
Janinów, Opole Voivodeship (south-west Poland)